Adelobasileus is a genus of mammaliamorph cynodonts from the Late Triassic (Carnian), about 225 million years ago. It is known only from a partial skull recovered from the Tecovas Formation in western Texas, southern United States, referred to the species Adelobasileus cromptoni.

Roughly contemporary with the mammaliaform Tikitherium, Adelobasileus predates the non-mammalian cynodonts Tritylodontidae and Tritheledontidae by 10 million years. Distinct cranial features, especially the housing of the cochlea, suggest that Adelobasileus is a transitional form in the character transformation from non-mammaliaform cynodonts to mammaliaforms. For this reason, it is thought to be a close relative of the common ancestor of all modern mammals. Though traditionally classified as a mammal by trait-based taxonomy, it is outside the crown group containing all true mammals.

References

Sources

External links

Adelobasileus from Palaeos

Prehistoric prozostrodonts
Prehistoric cynodont genera
Late Triassic synapsids
Triassic synapsids of North America
Fossil taxa described in 1990
Taxa named by Spencer G. Lucas
Taxa named by Adrian P. Hunt